CODASYL, the Conference/Committee on Data Systems Languages, was a consortium formed in 1959 to guide the development of a standard programming language that could be used on many computers. This effort led to the development of the programming language COBOL, the CODASYL Data Model, and other technical standards.

CODASYL's members were individuals from industry and government involved in data processing activity.  Its larger goal was to promote more effective data systems analysis, design, and implementation.  The organization published specifications for various languages over the years, handing these over to official standards bodies (ISO, ANSI, or their predecessors) for formal standardization.

History 
CODASYL is remembered almost entirely for two activities: its work on the development of the COBOL language and its activities in standardizing database interfaces. It also worked on a wide range of other topics, including end-user form interfaces and operating system control languages, but these projects had little lasting impact.

The remainder of this section is concerned with CODASYL's database activities.

In 1965 CODASYL formed a List Processing Task Force. This group was chartered to develop COBOL language extensions for processing collections of records; the name arose because Charles Bachman's IDS system (which was the main technical input to the project) managed relationships between records using chains of pointers. In 1967 the group renamed itself the Data Base Task Group (DBTG), and its first report in January 1968 was entitled COBOL extensions to handle data bases.

 In October 1969 the DBTG published its first language specifications for the network database model which became generally known as the CODASYL Data Model. This specification in fact defined several separate languages: a data definition language (DDL) to define the schema of the database, another DDL to create one or more subschemas defining application views of the database; and a data manipulation language (DML) defining verbs for embedding in the COBOL programming language to request and update data in the database. Although the work was focused on COBOL, the idea of a host-language independent database was starting to emerge, prompted by IBM's advocacy of PL/I as a COBOL replacement.

In 1971, largely in response to the need for programming language independence, the work was reorganized: development of the Data Description Language was continued by the Data Description Language Committee, while the COBOL DML was taken over by the COBOL language committee. With hindsight, this split had unfortunate consequences. The two groups never quite managed to synchronize their specifications, leaving vendors to patch up the differences. The inevitable consequence was a lack of interoperability among implementations.

A number of vendors implemented database products conforming (roughly) to the DBTG specifications: the best-known implementations were Honeywell's— originally General Electric's— Integrated Data Store (IDS/2), HP's IMAGE, Cullinet's Integrated Database Management System IDMS, ICL's 2900 IDMS (derived from Cullinet's product), Univac's DMS-1100, and Digital Equipment Corporation's DBMS for VMS (later known as Oracle Codasyl DBMS). Cullinet, originally known as Cullinane Database Systems, obtained the technology from B.F. Goodrich.  Cullinet was eventually sold to Computer Associates, which as of 2007 still sells and supports a version of IDMS.

ANSI and ISO adopted the CODASYL database specifications under the name Network Database Language (NDL), with work taking place within the same working group (X3H2) as SQL standardization. An ISO standard for NDL was ratified as ISO 8907:1987, but, as it never had any practical effect on implementations, it was formally withdrawn in 1998.

Some of the CODASYL committees continue their work today, but CODASYL itself no longer exists.  The records of CODASYL were donated to the Charles Babbage Institute.  CBI also hold the archival records for American National Standards Institute X3H2 records.

Interest in CODASYL gradually faded due to growing interest in relational databases beginning in the early 1980s.

See also
 Navigational database
 T. William Olle

References

Further reading 
The Codasyl Approach to Data Base Management. T. William Olle. Wiley, 1978. .
 The Codasyl Model. J. S. Knowles and D. M. R. Bell, in Databases - Role and Structure, ed. P. M. Stocker, P. M. D. Gray, and M. P. Atkinson, CUP, 1984. 
 Joseph M. Hellerstein and Michael Stonebraker "Readings in Database Systems", The MIT Press 2005 Page 8, Library of Congress Control Number: 2004113624,

External links 
Conference on Data Systems Languages Records, 1959-1987 {CODASYL}. Charles Babbage Institute, University of Minnesota.  CODASYL was a volunteer organization consisting of individuals from industry and government involved in data-processing activity. The organization was formed in 1959 to guide the development of a standard programming language, which led to the development of COBOL.  Collection contains minutes, correspondence, reports, documentation for COBOL, Nice Standard Control Language (NICOLA), the Journal of Development, and other publications from several CODASYL committees and task groups.
Conference on Data Systems Languages {CODASYL} Survey Report, 1968. "The CODASYL Systems Committee 1968 Survey of Data Base Systems" lists several dozen database systems surveyed by the group that created the CODASYL database standard.
American National Standards Institute. X3H2 records, 1978-1995. Charles Babbage Institute, University of Minnesota.  The ANSI X3H2 Committee, formed May 1978, was originally charged with creating a standard for the CODASYL network data model. The resulting NDL (network database language) standard was finished in 1982. The committee work on standardizing the relational data model resulted in the SQL (structured query language) standard in 1984.

COBOL
Data modeling languages
History of software